Synapturanus ajuricaba is a species of microhylid frog. It is endemic to the state of Para in Brazil.

Taxonomy 
Synapturanus ajuricaba was described in 2021 by a team of researchers, including Raffael Ernst, a German herpetologist.

Description 

Synapturanus ajuricaba has a snout-vent length of 29.3–37.3 mm. This makes it larger than S. rabus and S. salseri.

The species is found in the northern parts of the Brazilian states of Amazonas and Pará.

References 

ajuricaba
Amphibians of Brazil
Endemic fauna of Brazil
Amphibians described in 2021
Taxa named by Antoine Fouquet
Taxa named by Philippe J.R. Kok